Rizak Ram Dahiya or Chaudhary Rizak Ram was an Indian politician. He was a Member of Parliament, representing Haryana in the Rajya Sabha the upper house of India's Parliament as a member of the  Indian National Congress.

References

Rajya Sabha members from Haryana
Indian National Congress politicians